A constitutional referendum was held in Iran on 28 July 1989, alongside presidential elections. Allegedly approved by 97.6% of voters, it was the first and so far only time the Constitution of the Islamic Republic of Iran has been amended. It made several changes to articles 5, 107, 109, 111, and added article 176. It eliminated the need for the Supreme Leader (rahbar) of the country to be a marja or chosen by popular acclaim, it eliminated the post of prime minister, and it created a Supreme National Security Council.

Background
On 24 April 1989 while on his deathbed, Ayatollah Khomeini appointed a 25-man "Council for the Revision of the Constitution". The council named Ali Khamenei as Khomeini's successor as Supreme Leader of Iran and drew up several amendments to the original constitution. Since the senior mujtahid or Marja of Iran had given only lukewarm support to Khomeini's principle of rule by Islamic jurist, and Khamenei was not a marja, the original prerequisite that the rahbar (leader) be "a paramount faqih" (i.e. one of these marja) was dropped from the constitution.

Some changes to the constitution introduced by the Reform Council include:
changing the name of the Majlis-e Melli to the Majlis-e Islami.
increasing the size of the Assembly of Experts to 86 members
giving the Assembly of Experts the authority to convene at least once a year and to determine whether the Supreme Leader was ‘mentally and physically capable of carrying out his arduous duties.’
transforming the Expediency Council into a permanent body with members appointed by the Supreme Leader as well as representatives from the three branches of government, the armed forces, the intelligence service, and the Guardian Council.

The amendments were allegedly approved by Iranian voters and became law on 28 July 1989.

Members of the council

This is a list of members of Constitutional Amendment Council of Iran, appointed by Ayatollah Khomeini, who reviewed and amended the Constitution of Iran in 1989:

 Abbas Ali Amid-Zanjani
 Ebrahim Amini
 Ahmad Azari Qomi
 Asadollah Bayat
 Mohammad Emami-Kashani
 Hassan Habibi
 Najafgholi Habibi
 Hossein Hashemian
 Akbar Hashemi Rafsanjani
 Ahmad Jannati
 Mehdi Karroubi
 Ali Khamenei (deputy chairman)
 Hadi Khamenei
 Abolghasem Khazali
 Mohammad Reza Mahdavi-Kani
 Ali Meshkini (chairman)
 Mohammad Mohammadi Gilani
 Mohammad Daneshzadeh Mo'men
 Mir-Hossein Mousavi
 Abdolkarim Mousavi Ardebili
 Mohammad Mousavi-Khoiniha
 Abdollah Noori
 Hassan Taheri-Khorramabadi
 Mohammad Reza Tavassoli
 Mohammad Yazdi

Results

References

Referendums in Iran
Referendum, constitutional
Iran
Referendum
Constitutional referendums
Constitutional amendments
Government of the Islamic Republic of Iran